Aller Sand Pit is a 0.22 hectare geological Site of Special Scientific Interest in Devon, notified in 1969. It is the type section for the Aller Gravel.

See also
List of Sites of Special Scientific Interest in Devon

References 

Sites of Special Scientific Interest in Devon
Sites of Special Scientific Interest notified in 1969